Duke Tobin (born September 15, 1970) is the Director of Player Personnel for the Cincinnati Bengals of the National Football League (NFL). He played in the Arena Football League for the Orlando Predators in 1994 and Memphis Pharaohs in 1995. He played college football at Illinois & Colorado.

After his playing career, he joined the Cincinnati Bengals front office. His father Bill Tobin and uncle Vince Tobin have both had numerous jobs with the NFL. While it is not his official title, Tobin's day-to-day duties are similar to a general manager, therefore, he is occasionally, though incorrectly, referred to as the Bengals' General Manager.

References

1970 births
Living people
American football quarterbacks
Illinois Fighting Illini football players
Colorado Buffaloes football players
Orlando Predators players
Cincinnati Bengals executives
Memphis Pharaohs players